The 1901 St. Xavier Musketeers football team was an American football team that represented St. Xavier College (later renamed Xavier University) as a member of the Interscholastic League during the 1901 college football season. The team compiled a 9–0 record, shut out five of nine opponents, and outscored all opponents by a total of 234 to 28. The team won the Interscholastic League championship and, with it, The Enquirer Pennant. Fullback Mark Mitchell was the team captain.

Schedule

References

St. Xavier
Xavier Musketeers football seasons
St. Xavier Saints football